C. Todd Conover (October 13, 1939-December 9, 2018) was Comptroller of the Currency in the United States from 1981 to 1985  He was born in Bronxville, New York.

Conover, a California banking and management consultant, was named Comptroller by President Ronald Reagan. He presided over the agency during a period of dramatic change in financial services as deregulation increased competition and the services offered by banks.

Under Conover guidance, national banks began to offer discount brokerage services and investment advice and underwrite certain kinds of insurance. He reduced the number of regional offices to six, increasing their staffs and authority. After Conover resignation, he returned to his bank consulting practice.

He died in Meadow Vista, California on December 9, 2018.

References

External links 
US Department of Treasury, Todd C. Conover, Comptroller of the Currency 1981 to 1985

Comptrollers in the United States
United States Comptrollers of the Currency
1939 births
2018 deaths
People from Bronxville, New York
Reagan administration personnel